Neoblattella is a genus of cockroach in the family Ectobiidae.

Species
These 39 species belong to the genus Neoblattella:

 Neoblattella adspersicollis (Stål, 1860)
 Neoblattella adusta (Caudell, 1905)
 Neoblattella amazonensis Lopes & Khouri, 2009
 Neoblattella binodosa Hebard, 1926
 Neoblattella borinquenensis Rehn & Hebard, 1927
 Neoblattella carcinus Rehn & Hebard, 1927
 Neoblattella carrikeri Hebard, 1919
 Neoblattella carvalhoi Rocha e Silva & Lopes, 1976
 Neoblattella celeripes Rehn & Hebard, 1927
 Neoblattella detersa (Walker, 1868)
 Neoblattella dryas Rehn & Hebard, 1927
 Neoblattella elegantula Rocha e Silva, 1964
 Neoblattella eurydice Rehn & Hebard, 1927
 Neoblattella festae (Giglio-Tos, 1898)
 Neoblattella grossbecki Rehn & Hebard, 1927
 Neoblattella guadeloupensis Bonfils, 1969
 Neoblattella guanayara Gurney, 1942
 Neoblattella guianae Hebard, 1929
 Neoblattella infausta Rehn & Hebard, 1927
 Neoblattella longior Hebard, 1926
 Neoblattella lucubrans Rehn & Hebard, 1927
 Neoblattella maculiventris (Shelford, 1909)
 Neoblattella mista Lopes & Khouri, 2011
 Neoblattella nodipennis Hebard, 1926
 Neoblattella paulista Rocha e Silva & Gurney, 1963
 Neoblattella perdentata Bonfils, 1969
 Neoblattella picta Rocha e Silva & Gurney, 1962
 Neoblattella poecilopensis Lopes & Khouri, 2009
 Neoblattella poecilops Hebard, 1926
 Neoblattella proserpina Rehn & Hebard, 1927
 Neoblattella puerilis (Rehn, 1915)
 Neoblattella semota Rehn & Hebard, 1927
 Neoblattella sucina Rehn, 1932
 Neoblattella tapenagae Hebard, 1921
 Neoblattella titania (Rehn, 1903)
 Neoblattella tridens Rehn & Hebard, 1927
 Neoblattella unifascia Hebard, 1926
 Neoblattella vatia Rehn & Hebard, 1927
 Neoblattella vomer Rehn & Hebard, 1927

References

Cockroaches
Articles created by Qbugbot